The Philharmonisches Staatsorchester Mainz (literally: Philharmonic State Orchestra of Mainz), is the resident orchestra of the Staatstheater Mainz. In addition to musical theater and Tanztheater (concert dance) youth symphony and chamber concerts are part of the activity of the orchestra. It is one of the three symphony orchestras of Rhineland-Palatinate. Since September 2011, Hermann Bäumer has been principal conductor.

History

16th and 17th century  
Under Cardinal Elector Albert of Mainz, who  obtained the Electorate of Mainz in 1514, and in 1518 was made a cardinal at the age of 28, the orchestra is first mentioned as electoral court orchestra. The first verifiable conductor, Jan le Febure took up its duties at the Mainz court in 1601. In the following years the musical arrangement of numerous imperial coronations is evident, whereby the Mainz electoral court orchestra already gained early supraregional recognition. For example the orchestra performed in 1612 during the coronation of Matthias, Holy Roman Emperor. At the beginning of the 18th century, Elector Lothar Franz von Schönborn initiated the formation of a secular orchestra. This included the extension of the strings by woodwinds and horns. Elector von Schönborn was also setting records in the form of a decree to introduce a court musician.

18th and 19th century  
In 1777, a size of 35 members of the orchestra is documented. The first permanent theater in Mainz was built in 1760. Elector Emmerich Joseph von Breidbach zu Bürresheim allowed his musicians to participate in opera performances in this theater. Thus, the orchestra was now categorized as an opera orchestra. Only a few years later, elector Emmerich Joseph erected an Electoral Comedy House (Kürfürstliches Komödienhaus) at the avenue “Große Bleiche”. He subsidized the musical performances and made his band available for the opera. In the first musical almanac of 1782, the Mainz court orchestra was now listed among the finest in the territory of today's Germany. The opera itself made its mark during the following years, especially with Mozart's works. For example Mozart's Don Giovanni was performed as a premiere in German language in 1789 in Mainz. Besides the Mozart family grand tour, Mozart stayed several times in Mainz, and gave concerts with the orchestra. The opera flourished in Mainz at the end of the 18th century and was considered one of the best in Germany. The number of employed musicians in the court orchestra increased to 48, which was remarkable for that time. Elector Friedrich Karl Joseph von Erthal had upgraded the theater since the National Theatre. A few years later, during the War of the First Coalition, the comedy house was destroyed during the siege of Mainz (1793). The elector disposed the conversion of his stables to be used for a theater. It serve as a venue for the next 40 years.

With the end of the Electorate of Mainz, hard times began for the musicians. Only a small part of the orchestra remained in Mainz as the theater orchestra under new management. It was directly dependent on the success or failure of the ever-changing theater directors. This changed when in 1804 the circle “United Friends of Music” was founded and gave regular symphonic concerts, inviting important musicians, such as Niccolò Paganini and Franz Liszt.

On 21 September 1833, the curtain in the now newly built theater (today's Staatstheater Mainz) on Gutenberg Square rose for the first time for Carl Maria von Webers 9th "Jubilee Overture" and Mozart's La clemenza di Tito. The plight of the orchestra finally stabilized when the acquisition by the city of Mainz took place in 1876. Under the umbrella of the city authorities the 45 musicians were no longer under direct threat of financial failure of the theater. Under the first urban conductor Emil Steinbach, the Mainz stage was a leading house for Richard Wagner's works. His works were heard in concert as well. On 30 November 1877, the first public performance of Wagner's Siegfried Idyll was performed in Mainz, conducted by Steinbach. The world premiere of Hans Pfitzner's Der arme Heinrich (Poor Henry) on 24 March 1895 was conducted by the composer.

Hofkapellmeister and principal conductors 
The Hofkapellmeisters and principal conductors of the Philharmonisches Staatsorchester Mainz:

References

External links

German symphony orchestras
Music in Mainz
16th-century establishments in the Holy Roman Empire